Javier Andrés Ramírez Espinosa (born 19 September 1993), commonly known as Javier Ramírez, is a Colombian internet personality, vlogger, actor, presenter and singer. Born in Girardot, Cundinamarca. He has been recognized in Colombia for his commercials on TV, as a presenter, participating in several telenovelas and series, as well as in Colombian films. His most outstanding performance was in the telenovela Mentiras perfectas as Matías Ucross.

He currently has 2 million subscribers on his official YouTube account.

Personal life 
In October 2017 he openly confirmed that he is gay through a video uploaded to his YouTube account.

Selected filmography

Awards and nominations

References

External links 
 

1993 births
Living people
Spanish-language YouTubers
Colombian male telenovela actors
Colombian male actors
21st-century Colombian male actors
21st-century Colombian male singers
Colombian LGBT actors
People from Girardot, Cundinamarca
Colombian YouTubers
LGBT YouTubers
Gay actors
20th-century LGBT people
21st-century LGBT people